Alhassan Barrie (born 30 July 1995) is a Belgian basketball player for Gembo BBC of the Top Division 1. After three years of college basketball at Northern Oklahoma and Goshen, he has professionally played in Germany, Spain and the Netherlands.

College career
Barrie started playing college basketball with the Northern Oklahoma Mavericks. After one season, he left to play two years with the Goshen Maple Leafs. In his final year with Gospen, he averaged 8 points and 4 rebounds per game.

Professional career
On 29 July 2019, Barrie signed his first professional contract with Basketball Löwen Erfurt in Germany. In January 2020, Barrie signed with CAM Enrique Soler in the Spanish Liga EBA.

On 5 September 2020, Barrie signed with newly established club The Hague Royals of the Dutch Basketball League (DBL). He averaged 8.6 points and 4.4 rebounds over the 2020–21 season. On 13 September 2021, Barrie signed with Gembo BBC of the Top Division 1.

References

1995 births
The Hague Royals players
Dutch Basketball League players
Living people
Belgian expatriate basketball people in the United States
Belgian men's basketball players
Goshen Maple Leafs men's basketball players
Northern Oklahoma Mavericks men's basketball players
Small forwards
Sportspeople from Antwerp